Horacio Sánchez (born 22 March 1953) is a Mexican former footballer. He competed in the men's tournament at the 1972 Summer Olympics.

References

External links
 

1953 births
Living people
Footballers from Mexico City
Mexican footballers
Association football goalkeepers
Club Universidad Nacional footballers
Club Necaxa footballers
Club León footballers
Atlético Morelia players
Club Puebla players
Liga MX players
Mexico international footballers
Olympic footballers of Mexico
Footballers at the 1972 Summer Olympics